Rhys Alex Hughes (born 21 September 2001) is a Welsh professional footballer who plays as a midfielder for  club Tranmere Rovers.

Club career

Everton
Hughes joined the Academy at Everton at the age of six. He moved into club digs at the age of fourteen, though still managed to go on to achieve four A and four A* grades at GCSE. He signed a two-and-a-half year professional contract in January 2020, and scored three goals and provided six assists from fifteen league games for the under-18 team during the 2019–20 season. He was promoted to the under-23 team at the end of the campaign; Hughes stated that "with Unsy, [assistant manager] John Ebbrell and [Under-23s coach] Franny Jeffers, it’s a really good place to improve". He was named as the Keith Tamlin Award winner, an award which "represents all that is best in the Everton Youth Academy". He was nominated for the Premier League 2 Player of the Month award for January 2021, having scored in a 1–1 draw with Liverpool U23. However he was not offered a new contract when his deal expired in summer 2022.

Tranmere Rovers
On 21 June 2022, Hughes signed a two-year contract with EFL League Two club Tranmere Rovers. He made his debut for the club on 9 August, coming on as an 82nd-minute substitute for Lee O'Connor in a 2–2 draw at Accrington Stanley in the EFL Cup. He scored his first career goal at Prenton Park on 4 October, in a 5–3 defeat to Leeds United U23 in the EFL Trophy.

Style of play
Hughes is a midfielder with an excellent passing range and close ball control skills. David Unsworth described him as "an outstanding footballer with great technique and a great set-ball delivery".

Career statistics

References

2001 births
Living people
Footballers from Wrexham
Welsh footballers
Wales youth international footballers
Wales under-21 international footballers
Association football midfielders
Everton F.C. players
Tranmere Rovers F.C. players
English Football League players